Zapizolam is a pyridodiazepine drug, which is a benzodiazepine analog of pyridotriazolodiazepine group. It has sedative and anxiolytic effects similar to those produced by benzodiazepine derivatives, and has been sold illicitly as a designer drug.

References

Chloroarenes
GABAA receptor positive allosteric modulators
Pyridodiazepines